Lester Rowland Bell (December 14, 1901 – December 26, 1985) was an American professional baseball player, a third baseman who appeared in 896 games played in the Major Leagues from 1923 to 1931 for the St. Louis Cardinals, Boston Braves and Chicago Cubs.

Bell's professional career began in 1921 in minor league baseball.

Then in  Bell reached career bests in hits (189), home runs (17), runs batted in (100) and batting average (.325). He finished in the top five in the National League in hits, slugging percentage (.518), OPS (.901), total bases (301), home runs, extra-base hits (64) and RBI.  He also was among the NL leaders in strikeouts (62) and errors committed by a third baseman (22). Bell ranked sixth in the National League Most Valuable Player Award polling as the Cardinals won their first pennant and World Series championship. In the 1926 World Series against the New York Yankees, he played in all seven games and collected seven hits, including a two-run homer in Game 6 off Urban Shocker that salted away a 10–2 St. Louis triumph.

In , however, Bell played in only 115 games and his production fell off considerably, and in March 1928 he was traded to the Braves for fellow third baseman Andy High. He played two more big-league seasons in back-up roles before he returned to the minor leagues, where he would spend eight seasons as manager of his hometown Harrisburg Senators of the Class B Interstate League.

During his nine-year Major League career, Les Bell collected 938 hits, with 184 doubles and 49 triples accompanying his 66 home runs. He had 509 RBI in the majors.

External links

1901 births
1985 deaths
Albany Senators players
Baseball players from Harrisburg, Pennsylvania
Boston Braves players
Chicago Cubs players
Harrisburg Senators players
Houston Buffaloes players
Lansing Senators players
Louisville Colonels (minor league) players
Major League Baseball third basemen
Major League Baseball shortstops
Milwaukee Brewers (minor league) players
Minor league baseball managers
Reading Keystones players
St. Louis Cardinals players
Syracuse Stars (AA) players